Pyxis（）is a Japanese idol unit consisting of voice actresses Miku Itō and Moe Toyota.

Biography 
The unit was formed in May 2015, and they performed their first live concert in February 2016 titled "Pyxis Party 2016 〜Happy Valentine's Day〜".

After that, they continued their activities as an indie unit, working in magazines and radio shows. In May 2016, in the units' first anniversary concert, they announced a major label debut under Teichiku Records' new label "Rockin' Music".

Discography

Single

Albums

Tie-ups

See also 

 StylipS

References

External links 

 
 テイチクエンタテインメントによるオフィシャルサイト
 

Japanese musical duos
Anime singers
Japanese pop music groups